William Omar Landrón Rivera (born February 10, 1978), better known by his stage name Don Omar, is a Puerto Rican reggaeton rapper, singer, songwriter, record producer and actor. With over 40 awards from 60 nominations, he is one of the most successful artists of the reggaeton genre. On September 1, 2017, he announced that he would retire after a series of concerts at the José Miguel Agrelot Coliseum in Puerto Rico, scheduled to be held on December 15, 16 and 17. He returned to music on April 20, 2019 with his song single "Ramayama" featuring Farruko.

Omar has also portrayed Rico Santos in four films in the Fast & Furious franchise. He first played the character in 2009's Fast & Furious and then returned for Fast Five (2011), The Fate of the Furious (2017) and F9 (2021). He sold over 70 million albums.

Early life 
Don Omar was born in Santurce, a barrio of San Juan, Puerto Rico, where he was raised, the oldest son of William Landrón and Luz Antonia Rivera. From an early age, he showed interest in the music of Vico C and Brewley MC. During his youth, he became an active member of a Protestant church, Iglesia Evangélica Restauración en Cristo in Bayamón where he occasionally offered sermons. However, after four years, he left the church to dedicate himself to singing.

Career 
His first public performance in a night club was accompanied by disc jockey Eliel Lind Osorio. Afterwards, he appeared regularly on compilation albums from popular DJs and producers including Luny Tunes, Noriega, and DJ Eric. He also worked as a backup singer for the duo Héctor & Tito. One of the members, Héctor el Father, helped him produce his first solo album.

Omar's career rose to stardom with the release of his first studio album, The Last Don with Frankie Needles. Both the studio version and its live edition have been certified platinum by the Recording Industry Association of America. Worldwide, The Last Don: Live [CD & DVD] has sold over one million copies, according to his official website. He earned awards for Latin Pop Album of the Year and New Artist & Latin Rap/Hip-Hop Album of the Year by the Billboard Latin Music Awards in 2003. The Last Don: Live [CD & DVD] was also nominated for Urban Music Album at the 2005 Latin Grammy Awards.

Omar's May 2006 album King of Kings, became history's highest ranking reggaeton LP in the top 10 US charts, with its debut at #1 on the Latin sales charts and the #1 spot on the Billboard Latin Rhythm Radio Chart with his single "Angelito". Omar was also able to beat the in-store appearance sales record at Disney World's Virgin Megastore previously set by pop star Britney Spears.
 
With the highest charting debut by a reggaeton artist, Omar's King of Kings entered at No. 7 with 74,000 beating. In April 2007, Don Omar received the Billboard Latin Music Award for Reggaeton Album of the Year for King of Kings. Billboard recognized that King of Kings was the most successful album of the decade in Latin America, besides being the most successful in the history of the genre of reggaeton. Billboard estimated that the album sold over 4.1 million copies by the end of 2009.

Omar participated in Gilberto Santa Rosa's presentation in an event titled "Concierto del Amor", presented in the Madison Square Garden on February 9, 2008. He closed the event and performed reggaeton themes with Frankie Needles.

Omar's third studio album, iDon, was released on April 28, 2009. This album is of Sold over 2.5 million. "Virtual Diva" became the most requested song on Latin radio stations. The second official single, titled "Sexy Robótica", was released on July 6, 2009.

The album Don Omar Presents: Meet the Orphans was released on November 16, 2010. The album features the artists under Don Omar's Orfanato Music Group label and other reggaeton artists. The album includes the promotional single "Hasta Abajo" and the album's lead single "Danza Kuduro" featuring Portuguese-French singer Lucenzo, as well as collaborations from Orfanato Music Group artists including Kendo Kaponi, Syko, Plan B, Zion & Lennox, Yaga & Mackie and Danny Fornaris. "Danza Kuduro" appears on the Fast Five soundtrack and is the song played at the conclusion of the movie. He is signed to VI Music and Machete Music through Universal Music Latino. The album sold over 3 million.

The album Don Omar Presents MTO²: New Generation was released on May 1, 2012. The album features newly signed to Orfanato Music Group Natti Natasha as well as many other signed artists and other reggaeton artists like Zion & Lennox. The album includes the singles "Hasta Que Salga el Sol", which won the award for Best Urban Song at the 2012 Latin Grammy Awards, and "Dutty Love" featuring Natti Natasha, which was also nominated. The album also features collaborations with Juan Magán, Mims, Syko, Vinny el Vendito, and Yunel Cruz. The album has been well received as it won the award for Best Urban Music Album at the 2012 Latin Grammy Awards.

After a decade-long rivalry feud with fellow artist Daddy Yankee for the "King of Reggaeton" title, in early 2016 Daddy Yankee and Don Omar announced in a Billboard press conference that they would perform together on stage in a concert series called The Kingdom Tour. The tour announcement left many fans in disbelief, while selling out in minutes in cities like Las Vegas, Orlando, Los Angeles, New York. Discussing the tour and his rivalry with Daddy Yankee, Don Omar said "Let me clarify: I am not his best friend, and he is not my best friend, but we respect each other. That desire to be the best is what has pushed us to be better."

In September 2021, Omar signed a multi-year partnership with Saban Music Group. In February 2022, Omar was announced as a headliner of the 2022 Los Della Festival in San Bernardino, California.

Personal life 
In 2003, Omar had his first son, Nicolás Valle Gómez. Omar married forecaster/journalist Jackie Guerrido on April 19, 2008. In March 2011, it was revealed they had divorced.

Legal issues 
On September 18, 2007, Omar was briefly detained in Santa Cruz de la Sierra, Bolivia due to a legal dispute. A Bolivian concert promoter sued him and some of his management after he canceled a concert scheduled for earlier that year in La Paz as part of the international tour Up Close. The organization claimed that he had defrauded US$70,000 due to the cancellation. Omar responded that he canceled the concert because the company did not provide air tickets in time. After the case was presented before a local judge, both parties reached an agreement. Omar was allowed to leave the country in order to comply with a previously scheduled appearance in Buenos Aires on Argentine television and returned the next day to hold his concert in Santa Cruz's Tahuichi Aguilera football stadium.

Awards and nominations

Discography

Studio albums 
 The Last Don (2003)
 King of Kings (2006)
 iDon (2009)
 Meet the Orphans (2010)
 MTO²: New Generation (2012)
 The Last Don 2 (2015)
 The Last Album (2019)
 Sociedad Secreta (TDA)

Live albums 
 The Last Don Live (2004)
 King of Kings: Live (2007)

Compilation & Greatest Hits albums 
 Los Bandoleros (2005)
 Da Hitman Presents Reggaetón Latino (2005)
 Los Bandoleros Reloaded (2006)
 El Pentágono (2007)
 El Pentágono: The Return (2008)

Concert tours 
 King of Kings World Tour
 The Last World Tour
 iDon World Tour
 Meet the Orphans World Tour
 MTO²: New Generation World Tour
 Hecho en Puerto Rico
 Retro Evolución World Tour
 The Kingdom Tour

Filmography

See also 

 List of Puerto Ricans

References

External links 

 Official website 
 Official website for iDon album
 Official page at MySpace
 Official page at Facebook
 

Don Omar
Living people
Latin Grammy Award winners
Machete Music artists
People from Santurce, Puerto Rico
21st-century Puerto Rican male singers
Puerto Rican pop singers
Puerto Rican rappers
Puerto Rican reggaeton musicians
Universal Music Latino artists
21st-century American rappers
Puerto Rican people of African descent
1978 births
Latin music songwriters